Natoye is a village and a district in the municipality of Hamois, located in the province of Namur, Belgium. 

There is a fortified farm from the 17th century in the village, as well as a château, dating largely from a reconstruction made in 1875. In Skeuvre, there is also a château, an ensemble of buildings from the 18th and 19th centuries.

References

External links

Former municipalities of Namur (province)